Epitrepontes (translated as The Arbitration or The Litigants) is an Ancient Greek comedy, written c. 300 BCE by Menander. Only fragments of the play have been found, primarily on papyrus, yet it is one of Menander's best preserved plays. 

Fragments of it were found in 1907, alongside Perikeiromene and Samia in the Cairo Codex.  Additional fragments of the play have been found since its initial discovery. In 2012, the Michigan Papyrus was published, giving better readings to Acts 3 and 4 of the play.

Epitrepontes (Greek: "arbitration") features a conflict - and attempts to resolve that conflict - between two Athenian households, as well as depicting conflicts in a marriage. The play's most famous incident features a comical scene of legal arbitration. Two parties want the court to decide who should take ownership of goods found alongside an abandoned baby. The play gradually reveals the baby's history, and the identity of its parents, in the process of a complex exploration of marriage and family. The play also features sexual assault.

Plot

Pamphile, a young Athenian woman, gives birth to a child only five months after her wedding to her husband Charisios. In shame and fear for her marriage and familial reputation, she has her servant abandon the baby (as was an accepted practice in contemporaneous Greek society), along with tokens in the form of jewels, to aid the baby's future identification. At the time of the birth, Charisios was away on a business trip, and would not have known that a child was born at all, if not for his slave, Onesimos, telling him of seeing the child being abandoned. 

Charisios suspects Pamphile of infidelity, and leaves her. He moves in with a neighbour, Chairestratos, and begins to spend money, including Pamphile's dowry, on drinking and carousing (including taking up with a hetaera named Habrotonon). Furious that Chairos is wasting Pamphile's dowry, her father, Smikrines, demands she divorce Charisios. Pamilphile loyally refuses.

References

External links
 
 From Mount Sinai to Michigan: the rediscovery of Menander’s Epitrepontes (part 1)
 Reading 5: Menander's Epitrepontes

Plays by Menander
Plays set in ancient Greece